"The Nittany Lion" is a traditional fight song played by the Penn State Blue Band at football games and other sporting events. During the pre-game show of home football games at Beaver Stadium, it is part of the traditional Lion Fanfare and Downfield. While it is not the official fight song of Penn State, it is one of the songs most widely associated with the university, and is also incorrectly referred to as  "Hail to the Lion" (or Lions). On Fridays and Saturdays, the clock tower in Penn State's Old Main plays a line of the chorus music at the fifteen-minute mark of each hour, and adds a line every 15 minutes until the whole chorus is played on the completion of the hour.

History 

"The Nittany Lion" was written by Penn State graduate and former Glee Club member James Leyden between 1922 and 1924. Professor Hummel Fishburn and Blue Band Bandmaster Tommy Thompson assisted Leyden in finishing the song, which was premiered at a pep rally the night before a football game to instant popularity.

The second verse was used prior to 1993, when Penn State was an IA Independent school.  When it joined the Big Ten athletically in 1993, the third verse, The Big Ten verse, was written.  Currently the Blue Band performs the first and third verse of The Nittany Lion.

See also
 Penn State Alma Mater, official alma mater of Pennsylvania State University
 Fight On, State, official fight song of Pennsylvania State University

References

External links 
 Mp3 of "The Nittany Lion" at the Penn State Blue Band website
 Mp3 of "The Nittany Lion" at the Penn State Glee Club website

American college songs
College fight songs in the United States
Nittany
Year of song missing
1920s songs